Thomas Hogg (21 March 1908 – 26 October 1965) was an English professional footballer who played as a forward for Bradford Park Avenue and Rochdale. He later worked as a referee and a teacher.

References

1908 births
1965 deaths
Bradford (Park Avenue) A.F.C. players
Rochdale A.F.C. players
English footballers
Association football forwards